The Kuzma-Offenhauser, nicknamed the Dean Van Lines Special, was an open-wheel race car chassis designed and developed by automotive mechanic and engineer Eddie Kuzma for U.S.A.C. Indy car racing, between 1953 and 1965.

References

Indianapolis 500
American Championship racing cars
Open wheel racing cars